Nienaszów  is a village in the administrative district of Gmina Nowy Żmigród, within Jasło County, Subcarpathian Voivodeship, in south-eastern Poland.

The village has an approximate population of 1,200.

References

Villages in Jasło County